East Bethel is a city in Anoka County, Minnesota, United States. The population was 11,786 at the 2020 census.

Minnesota State Highway 65 and Anoka County Road 22 are the main routes in the city. Highway 65 runs north–south, and County Road 22 (Viking Boulevard) runs east–west.

Geography

East Bethel is in the northern part of Anoka County. The city contains the primary site of the Cedar Creek Ecosystem Science Reserve

Central Minneapolis is 26 miles (42 km) to the southeast, along the Mississippi River, with the nearest international airport at Minneapolis–Saint Paul, 34 miles (52 km) southeast.

Adjacent cities
 Columbus (southeast)
 Ham Lake (south)
 Andover (southwest)
 Oak Grove (west)
 St. Francis (northwest)
 Bethel (northwest)

The neighborhood of Coopers Corner is in northern East Bethel, and the neighborhood of Coon Lake Beach is in southeastern East Bethel.

History
Linwood Township split from Bethel Township in 1871.

East Bethel was incorporated as a village on June 7, 1957, and was incorporated as the city of East Bethel on January 1, 1974.

Demographics

2010 census
As of the census of 2010, there were 11,626 people, 4,060 households, and 3,221 families living in the city. The racial makeup of the city was 95.9% White, 0.4% African American, 0.5% Native American, 1.6% Asian, 0.3% from other races, and 1.3% from two or more races. Hispanic or Latino of any race were 1.0% of the population.

There were 4,060 households, of which 39.6% had children under the age of 18 living with them, 66.9% were married couples living together, 6.6% had a female householder with no husband present, 5.8% had a male householder with no wife present, and 20.7% were non-families. 14.4% of all households were made up of individuals, and 3.6% had someone living alone who was 65 years of age or older. The average household size was 2.86 and the average family size was 3.15.

The median age in the city was 38.6 years. 26.2% of residents were under the age of 18; 7.9% were between the ages of 18 and 24; 26.8% were from 25 to 44; 31.9% were from 45 to 64; and 7% were 65 years of age or older. The gender makeup of the city was 52.2% male and 47.8% female.

2000 census
As of the census of 2000, there were 10,941 people, 3,607 households, and 2,936 families living in the city. The racial makeup of the city was 97.55% White, 0.19% African American, 0.43% Native American, 0.45% Asian, 0.32% from other races, and 1.06% from two or more races. Hispanic or Latino of any race were 0.95% of the population.

There were 3,607 households, out of which 47.2% had children under the age of 18 living with them, 70.6% were married couples living together, 6.1% had a female householder with no husband present, and 18.6% were non-families. 13.6% of all households were made up of individuals, and 2.8% had someone living alone who was 65 years of age or older. The average household size was 3.03 and the average family size was 3.33.

In the city, the population was spread out, with 32.1% under the age of 18, 6.9% from 18 to 24, 36.9% from 25 to 44, 20.0% from 45 to 64, and 4.0% who were 65 years of age or older. The median age was 33 years. For every 100 females, there were 108.1 males. For every 100 females age 18 and over, there were 109.5 males.

The median income for a household in the city was $57,880, and the median income for a family was $62,004. Males had a median income of $40,599 versus $27,377 for females. The per capita income for the city was $21,087. About 2.2% of families and 3.8% of the population were below the poverty line, including 4.1% of those under age 18 and 8.3% of those age 65 or over.

Transportation
  Minnesota State Highway 65
  Anoka County Road 22

References

External links
 East Bethel City Website

Cities in Anoka County, Minnesota
Cities in Minnesota